La Vall d'Ebo is a municipality in the province of Alicante and autonomous community of Valencia, Spain.

References

Populated places in the Province of Alicante